Champagne Problems may refer to

 Champagne Problems (album), 2022 album by Inna released in two parts—Champagne Problems #DQH1 and Champagne Problems #DQH2
 "Champagne Problems" (Nick Jonas song), 2015
 "Champagne Problems" (Taylor Swift song), 2020
 "Champagne Problems", a song by Katy Perry from the album Smile, 2020
 "Champagne Problems", a song by Meghan Trainor from the album Thank You, 2016